Uchakattam is a 1980 Indian Tamil-language thriller film directed by N. S. Rajbharath and produced by S. Kannan. The soundtrack was composed by the duo Shankar–Ganesh. The film stars Sarath Babu and Sunitha, with Y. G. Mahendran, A. R. Srinivasan and Jayaram playing supporting roles. N. S. Rajbharath  went on to direct the 1981 thriller movie, Chinna Mul Peria Mul. The film was remade in Kannada in 1982 as Prema Matsara by C. V. Rajendran.

Cast
 Sarath Babu as Dr. Kiran
 Sunitha as Latha
 Y. G. Mahendran as Ganesh (A Stranger)
 Jayaram as Dr. Bhashim
 Oru Viral Krishna Rao as Guest
 Rajkumar as Raj, Cameo appearance
 Madhan as Mohan
 A. R. Srinivasan as Inspector Ram

Production
The film was initially titled as Mutrupulli, however poet Vaali found the title to be inauspicious and suggested the title Uchakattam.

Soundtrack

Music was composed by Shankar–Ganesh and lyrics were written by Vaali.

References

1980 films
1980s Tamil-language films
Films scored by Shankar–Ganesh
Indian mystery thriller films
1980s crime thriller films
1980s mystery thriller films
Tamil films remade in other languages
Indian crime thriller films
Films set in 1980
Films directed by N. S. Rajbharath